Tiernny Arlene Wiltshire (born 8 May 1998) is a US-born Jamaican footballer who plays as a forward for National Women's Soccer League club Houston Dash and the Jamaica women's national team.

Club career
Wiltshire previously played for Israeli Ligat Nashim club Maccabi Emek Hefer during the 2020–2021 season. She made 14 appearances and scored seven goals (four regular-season league goals, two national cup goals, and one league cup goal). She returned to the U.S. upon the end of the season and joined the Houston Dash as a trialist.

In 2021, Wiltshire signed a short-term contract with Finnish Kansallinen Liiga team Kuopio Palloseura.

On 25 August 2022, Wiltshire was signed with the Houston Dash as a forward for the remainder of the 2022 season.

International career
Wiltshire made her senior debut for Jamaica on 30 September 2019.

References 

1998 births
Living people
Citizens of Jamaica through descent
Jamaican women's footballers
Women's association football forwards
Women's association football defenders
Ligat Nashim players
Jamaica women's international footballers
Jamaican expatriate women's footballers
Jamaican expatriate sportspeople in Israel
Expatriate women's footballers in Israel
People from Elmer, New Jersey
Sportspeople from Salem County, New Jersey
Soccer players from New Jersey
American women's soccer players
Rutgers Scarlet Knights women's soccer players
African-American women's soccer players
American sportspeople of Jamaican descent
American expatriate women's soccer players
American expatriate sportspeople in Israel
21st-century African-American sportspeople
21st-century African-American women
Houston Dash players